Porlamar is a city and major seaport in the state of Nueva Esparta in the Margarita Island, Venezuela. The city of Nueva Esparta state (made up of three islands), it lies on Margarita Island in the Caribbean Sea, off the South American mainland.

History

The city was founded as Puerto de la Mar (now Porlamar) on the southeast coast in 1536, less than 40 years after Christopher Columbus first sailed through. In 1561, it was briefly captured by the Latin American conquistador and rebel, Lope de Aguirre. Following its capture, Aguirre and his men executed several of the towns residents, including its governor, as well as looted the royal treasury. Even after Aguirre's demise on the mainland, the beach in which he first landed on the island is still referred to as playa del Tirana (Tyrant's beach)

In 1680 the Council of the Indies ordered Margarita born Juan Fermín de Huidobro to build a fortress with four bastions and a watchtower known as San Carlos Borromeo. Porlamar was a quiet fishing village until the arrival of air travel. Since then, it has become the central hub of the island with shops, restaurants and nightlife supported mostly by European and Venezuelan tourism.

Demographics
Porlamar holds about one-third of Margarita Island's population.

Economy
Porlamar is Margarita Island's center of commerce. Since it was granted free-port status in 1973, its boutique-lined avenues have been crowded with tourists. In the late 1990s, the economic downfall hit Porlamar.

Transportation

Geography

Climate
Porlamar has a hot semi-arid climate (Köppen BSh) with hot day time temperatures and warm night time temperatures year round. Rainfall peaks from June to August and from November to February. Average sunshine hours are very consistent year round.

Twin cities
 Cancún, Mexico
 Cartagena, Colombia
 Miami, USA

References

External links 
San Francisco Chronicle article

 
Margarita Island
Cities in Nueva Esparta
Populated places established in 1536
Populated coastal places in Venezuela
1536 establishments in the Spanish Empire